Kiche may refer to:

Kʼicheʼ (disambiguation), several uses
Kiche, Republic of Dagestan, a place in Russia

See also
Quiche (disambiguation)